Chettathi is a 1965 Malayalam language film. The film was directed by S. R. Puttanna Kanagal, starring Ambika, Prem Nazir, Sathyan and Thikkurissy Sukumaran Nair in the lead roles. Music of this film was done by M. S. Baburaj. It tells the story of a young widow. The core plot of the movie is partially inspired by Triveni's Kannada novel Hannele Chiguridaga.

Plot
Premachandran.(Sathyan) is the elder son of Master.(Thikkurissy Sukumaran Nair). Nirmala (Ambika) is his fiancée. Premachandran, who is working in a factory at Coimbatore comes home after a long time for their marriage. Prabhakaran (Prem Nazir) is Premachandran's younger brother who is in love with Vasanthy. After marriage, Premachandran returns to work, leaving Nirmala at his home. Nirmala takes good care of her father-in-law and brother-in-law and gains their love. Meanwhile, Premachandran meets with an accident at work and dies. This shocks the whole family. Gopi, Prabhakarans's colleague who is a womanizer develops a love interest towards Nirmala and proposes to  her. But she declines. Prabhakaran's love and respect towards Nirmala is misunderstood by his father. Nirmala, with a broken heart, leaves home and joins her sister Susheela and husband Viswanathan. Prabhakaran, who refused to marry, gets married at the request of Nirmala. Prabhakaran gets uneasy with his wife's lazy attitude and he begins to complain, comparing each and everything with Nirmala. This creates a problem in his marriage life. Viswanathan approaches Nirmala with the wrong intention, but fails. He tells Susheela that Nirmala tried to entice him. Susheela asks Nirmala to leave the house. She comes back to her husband's home. There she overhears the fight between Prabhakaran and Vasanthy. Knowing that her presence creates problems with everyone's life, she leaves home. Master and Prabhakaran follow her, but they find Nirmala in a disturbed mental state. Soon Nirmala dies.

Cast
 Prem Nazir as Prabhakaran
 Sathyan as Premachandran
 Ambika Sukumaran as Nirmala
 Sukumari as Bharathi
 Adoor Bhasi as Bharghavan
 Thikkurissy Sukumaran Nair as Master
 Kottayam Chellappan  as Viswanathan
 T. K. Balachandran as Gopi
 Ushakumari as Susheela
 Chithra as Vasanthy
 Prathapachandran as Gopi's Friend

Soundtrack
The music was composed by M. S. Baburaj and the lyrics were written by Vayalar Ramavarma.

References

1965 films
1960s Malayalam-language films
Films scored by M. S. Baburaj
Films directed by Puttanna Kanagal